Jochen Richard Mass (born 30 September 1946) is a German former racing driver.

Life and career

Born in Dorfen, Bavaria 50 km (31 mi) from Munich, Mass participated in 114 Formula One World Championship Grands Prix, debuting on 14 July 1973 at the British Grand Prix. He won one GP race (1975 Spanish Grand Prix), secured no pole positions, achieved 8 podiums and scored a total of 71 championship points.

Mass is perhaps best known for his on-track incident with Gilles Villeneuve which led to the latter's death. On 8 May 1982, with only 10 minutes left until the end of the qualifying session for the 1982 Belgian Grand Prix at Zolder, Villeneuve collided with Mass while attempting to overtake him. As Villeneuve came up behind Mass exiting a super-fast left turn, Mass moved to the right hand side of the track to let Villeneuve through. Villeneuve had already committed to the right hand side and the two cars touched wheels, launching the Canadian skyward. Villeneuve's car hit the ground nose-first and was then torn apart in a series of violent cartwheels. His seat was dislodged and he was flung from his car, landing heavily among the catch fencing at the opposite side of the track. Mass stopped his car, jumped out and ran back to Villeneuve's wrecked car. Villeneuve was flown to hospital and taken off life-support later that evening.

After leaving the Formula One circuit, Mass enjoyed great success in sports car racing, gaining international prominence with his performance during the European Touring Car Championship in the early 1970s. In 1972, he teamed up with Hans-Joachim Stuck to drive a Ford Capri RS2600 to victory at the Spa 24 Hours endurance race in Belgium. He went on to win that year's World Sportscar Championship. He finished second to Clay Regazzoni and Arturo Merzario in a November 1972 9-hour race at the Kyalami Circuit, in Johannesburg, South Africa. Mass' co-driver in a Chevron B-21 was Gerry Birrell. Mass, driving a Surtees TS-15, tied with Jean Pierre Beltoise in qualifying for the
Jim Clark Memorial Formula Two auto race in April 1973 held at Hockenheim, both drivers recording times of 2 minutes, 2.8 seconds, for an average of 124.3 miles per hour.

Mass placed second to Jean-Pierre Jarier in a Formula Two race at Nivelles, in June 1973. He had finished second in the first heat and third in the second. He completed his first Formula One race at the 1973 German Grand Prix at the Nürburgring. Mass came in seventh in a Surtees. He drove a McLaren-Ford to third place in the 1975 Brazilian Grand Prix at Interlagos.

Mass won the 1975 Spanish Grand Prix after leader, Rolf Stommelen's car hit a protective barrier, exploded into flames and catapulted into the crowd at the Montjuich circuit. Four spectators were killed and twelve were injured. Stommelen suffered multiple fractures and was in a critical condition after the accident. Mass was declared the winner in his Texaco McLaren-Ford, when the race was stopped immediately after the accident.

Merzario and Mass led an Alfa Romeo sweep of the first two positions in the 1975 Coppa Florio manufacturers championship automobile race at Pergusa. Mass was third in the 1975 French Grand Prix at Le Castellet. On lap 44 he broke the record set by Denny Hulme, clocking a time of 1:50.60 over the 3.61-mile circuit. Mass and Jacky Ickx teamed in a Porsche to claim victory in the Dijon Six-Hour Race. Mass won the eighth and final race of the 1976 World Sports Car Championship series. He completed the 4.2 kilometre, Salzburg course in 1 hour, 28 minutes, 25.24 seconds, with an average speed of 125 m.p.h.

Mass and Ickx drove a Porsche 935 in the 1977 24 Hours of Daytona endurance race. Mass was clocked at 126.477 m.p.h. around the 3.84 mile Daytona road course. Mass won both 20-lap heats of the 1977 Jim Clark Memorial race in Hockenheim. He drove a March-BMW. Mass' Arrows turned over several times at the 1980 Austrian Grand Prix at Zeltweg. He bruised his neck and wrenched a vertebra but was able to leave the hospital.

Mass was convinced to stop racing Formula One cars after an accident with Mauro Baldi at the 1982 French Grand Prix at Paul Ricard. His March and the Arrows of Baldi touched at maximum speeds, both cars flying off the track and through a containment fence. Mass's car continued, hitting a tyre-lined guardrail. The March finally came to rest upside down and on fire, almost halfway into a spectator area. Amazingly he escaped with light burns only, and Baldi was uninjured.

Among his many victories, in 1985 he won the Circuito del Mugello 1,000 km race in Italy driving a Porsche 962C and in 1987 partnered with Bobby Rahal to claim victory at the 1987 12 Hours of Sebring race. Mass and Bobby Rahal combined to win the Champion Spark Plug Grand Prix at the Mid-Ohio Sports Car Course in Lexington, Ohio. Driving a Porsche 962, they inherited the lead 18 laps from the end. Mass won the most prestigious endurance race of all, the 24 Hours of Le Mans, in 1989 driving a Sauber Mercedes C9. It was the second triumph for Mercedes-Benz at Le Mans, their previous win having come in 1952.

Jochen Mass now drives the Mercedes-Benz museum's historic cars. In the 2004 Mille Miglia, he drove the original Mercedes-Benz 300 SLR that Stirling Moss had driven to victory in the 1955 race. To raise money for charity, the passenger seat next to him was auctioned off to the highest bidder.

From 1994 to 1998, he also announced the Formula One races for German broadcaster RTL.

Mass played himself in Ron Howard's 2013 film Rush.

Racing record

Career summary

 Graded drivers not eligible for  European Formula Two Championship points

Complete European Formula Two Championship results
(key) (Races in bold indicate pole position; races in italics indicate fastest lap)

 Graded drivers not eligible for  European Formula Two Championship points

24 Hours of Le Mans results

Complete British Saloon Car Championship results
(key) (Races in bold indicate pole position; races in italics indicate fastest lap.)

Complete Formula One World Championship results
(key) (races in italics indicate fastest lap)

 Half points awarded as less than 75% of race distance was completed.

Complete Formula One non-championship results
(key)

References

1946 births
Living people
Sportspeople from Munich
Racing drivers from Bavaria
German racing drivers
German Formula One drivers
Surtees Formula One drivers
McLaren Formula One drivers
Arrows Formula One drivers
ATS Wheels Formula One drivers
March Formula One drivers
Formula One race winners
European Formula Two Championship drivers
International Race of Champions drivers
24 Hours of Le Mans drivers
24 Hours of Spa drivers
24 Hours of Le Mans winning drivers
World Sportscar Championship drivers
European Touring Car Championship drivers
12 Hours of Sebring drivers
Porsche Motorsports drivers
David Price Racing drivers
West Competition drivers
Mercedes-AMG Motorsport drivers
Team Joest drivers
Sauber Motorsport drivers